The 2022 King's Cup Sepaktakraw World Championship was the 35th edition of the international sepak takraw tournament King's Cup World Championship, co-organized by the Takraw Association of Thailand and the International Sepaktakraw Federation (ISTAF), held on 24 - 31 July 2022 at Fashion Island Sports World in Bangkok, Thailand. Twenty-three ISTAF member countries, mostly from Asia-Oceania, participated in the tournament.

Originally due to take place from 20 to 27 September 2020 at Fashion Island Sports World in Bangkok, the venue was changed to Udonthani in February 2020 after the Sports Association of Udon Thani Province request to host the tournament, and then back to Bangkok on 24 to 31 July 2022 due to the COVID-19 pandemic. Previously, the tournament was being postponed five times due to the aforementioned incidence; twice in late 2020, then in March and September 2021, to January 2022, and to 24-31 July, furthermore, the venue was also moved back to Bangkok. This is also the first time the King's Cup has been postponed, since its inception in 1985.

The tournament consisted of 222 matches played, which was classified into 11 event categories, three of which, namely Men's regu (MR), Men's team regu (MT), and Men's quad (MQ), was divided into two divisions; Premier (PM) and Division 1 (D1). Out of all 14 gold medals, Thailand won the most with six medals, followed by South Korea which won two medals in Men's quad and Women's double in the premier division. The competition was beamed live to a virtual audience worldwide via a digital terrestrial television and satellite television channel Mono 29 of Thailand.

Background

History
After the excellent success of Thailand to host the 34th King's Cup Sepak Takraw World Championship in 2019, the country prepared to hold the subsequent tournament at the same venue, Fashion Island Sports World in Bangkok, from 20 to 27 September 2020. Nevertheless, during the internal meeting of the Executive Committee of the Takraw Association of Thailand on 27 February 2021, the committee officially endorsed a switching of the tournament venue to the province of Udon Thani, after being requested to host such an event, at the Montatip Hall located on UD Town Department Store in Udon Thani, by the local sports association, with the same schedule as planned. Howbeit, the race did not happen due to the global surge of the COVID-19 infection and was postponed to December 2020. 

On 5 December 2020, after an annual meeting, the vice-president of the association stated that the situation of the COVID-19 outbreak must still be seen as well as the government travel restrictions during the pandemic, which causes a complicated challenge for the organizer to hold the tournament. Therefore, the 35th King’s Cup World Championship has set a new schedule of competition to be March 2021, with Udon Thani to remain hosting as before. Nonetheless, the event still could not happen as a result of the spike of COVID-19 infected number in Thailand in early 2021.

Later on 27 March 2021, the annual general meeting of the National Olympic Committee of Thailand has addressed the tournament issue and adopted the resolution to reprogramme the tournament to be held in September 2021, in the same host province. However, the president citing that the event might be again suspended to be conducted in 2022 instead, in case if the Thailand Coronavirus Disease 2019 Management Center (CDMC) does not allow the international players and staff teams to visit the country without a 14-days quarantine period, which will generate an exceptionally tremendous expense for the federation. The association also made an additionally regulation on 4 April 2021, citing all participated players and staff must be full-vaccinated and each has to separately start a 7-day quarantine period at the hotel serving as an alternative quarantine facility before taking part in the tournament, aiming to be the precautionary measure amidst the COVID-19 pandemic.

In April 2022, International Sepak Takraw Federation (ISTAF) secretary-general Datuk Abdul Halim Kader stated that the 35th King's Cup was rescheduled to be held in Bangkok on 24-31 July, and over 30 countries was expected to participate. The tournament consisted of five men's categories, five women's categories, and two mixed events. Moreover, the video challenge camera to judge disputed services was also introduced in such an edition.

Originally, two new-category events was planned to be introduced in this edition; firstly, the mixed doubles duo with one man and woman on each team, and secondly, the mixed regu with one man and two women in the team, aiming to obtain the international federation approval before making it the official sport at the 2021 Asian Indoor and Martial Arts Games, which was also held in Thailand in March 2022, but the plan was later canceled due to the postponement of the tournament.

Participating countries
Twenty-three ISTAF membership countries confirmed to participate, including;

 Asian Sepaktakraw Federation (ASTAF)

 
 
 
 
 
 
 
 
 
 
 
 
 
 

 
 
 
 
 
 
 
Federation of European Sepak Takraw Associations (FESTA)
 
ISTAF members with no regional affiliation

Tournament detail

Division and category
The tournament was divided into three categories: male, female, and mixed. Due to a high number of the participating team in the male category, the category was further divided into Premier division (PM) and Division 1 (D1). Each country is allowed a maximum of 3 participating events in each category.

Men's category

Women's category
No divided division for the women's category due to the small number of participating teams.

Mixed category
No divided division for the mixed's category due to the small number of participating teams.

Schedule

Results Summary

Men's category

Women's category

Mixed category

Medal table

 Premier division

 Division 1

Regu

Men's regu (MR)

MR Premier division (MR-PM)

MR-PM Group stage
Group A

Group B

MR-PM Final

MR Division 1 (MR-D1)

MR-D1 Group stage
Group A

Group B

MR-D1 Final

Women's regu (WR)

WR-PM Group stage
Group A

Group B

Group C

Group D

WR-PM Final

Team regu

Men's team regu (MT)

MT Premier division (MT-PM)

MT-PM Group stage
Group A

Group B

MT-PM Final

MT Division 1 (MT-D1)

MT-D1 Group stage
Group A

Group B

MT-D1 Final

Women's team regu (WT)

WT-PM Group stage
Group A

Group B

WT-PM Final

Quad

Men's Quad (MQ)

MQ Premier division (MQ-PM)

MQ-PM Group stage
Group A

Group B

MQ-PM Final

MQ Division 1 (MQ-D1)

MQ-D1 Group stage
Group A

Group B

MQ-D1 Final

Women's Quad (WQ)

WQ-PM Group stage
Group A

Group B

Group C

Group D

WQ-PM Final

Doubles

Men's doubles (MD)

MD-PM Group stage
Group A

Group B

Group C

Group D

MD-PM Final

Women's doubles (WD)

WD-PM Group stage
Group A

Group B

WD-PM Final

Mixed Quad (Mx.Q)

Mx.Q Group stage
Group A

Group B

Mx.Q Final round

Hoop

Ranking round
The ranking round of Hoop events was conducted on the first day of the tournament. The four highest-scoring teams in each category (Men and Women) progressed to the final round. The scoring result was listed below.

 Men's hoop (MH)

 : 0
 : 0
 : 420 (QF2)

 : 310 (QF3)
 : 20 (QF4)
 : 620 (QF1)

 Women's hoop (WH)
 : 260 (QF3)
 : 180 (QF4)
 : 380 (QF2)
 : 600 (QF1)

Final round
Men's hoop

Women's hoop

References

King's Cup Sepaktakraw World Championship
2022 in Thai sport
January 2022 sports events in Thailand